The Air Weapons Complex (AWC) is a scientific research and development military complex engage in explosive engineering, specifically in airborne system. The AWC is operated and controlled by the Pakistan Air Force as its military unit that is dedicated towards developing and integrating the aerospace warfighting technologies and providing warfighting capabilities to the Pakistan Air Force.

Since its establishment in 1992, the AWC has designed and developed the air-launched cruise missile (ALCM) for the Air Force and participated in technical demonstrations in conjunction with nation's major defense contractors such as NESCOM, DESTO, and the Ministry of Defence (MoD).

Products

Airborne systems
 Airborne Video Tape Recorder (AVTR) system
 Airborne Digital Data Recorder system
 Infra-red search and track (IRST) system
 GPS navigation system
 Mechanical gyro and iFOG-based inertial navigation system (INS)
 MOHAFIZ counter-measures dispensing system
 Laser guidance system for Mk.80 series bombs (license-manufactured design from the US)

Air-launched weaponry
 Practice bombs (6 kg, 11 kg)
 250 kg Pre-fragmented bomb
 250 kg Mk.82 general-purpose bomb
 500 kg Mk.83 bomb
 1000 kg Mk.84 bomb
 Mk.80 series general-purpose bomb tail units (low drag or high drag speed-retarding devices)
 HAFR-1, HAFR-2 and RPB-1 anti-runway weapons 
 H-2 SOW
 H-4 SOW
 Ra'ad ALCM
 Ra'ad-II ALCM

Electronics
 Air Defence Automation System (C4I system) - given to Bangladesh, installed by AWC engineers circa 2005.
 Electronic fuses for air-launched weapons (impact and proximity fuses)
 Real-time ACMI system
 Voice/Fax/Data encryption system

Other
 Multi-Spectral Camouflage Net - camouflages against night-vision, infra-red, radar and millimeter wave sensors as well as visual detection. Stated to reduce an object's radar cross-section (RCS) by 86% on average and reduce average detection range by 43.8%.

Technical Expertise
 Software Development for Mission Critical Systems
 Nondestructive Testing Software and Mechanical Support
 Electronic System Design and Production
 Prototyping and Production of Specialized Mechanical Assemblies
 Mechanical Components Precision Manufacturing
 TQM Practices
 Mil-Spec Qualifications
 CAD/CAM Support

UAV project
The Air Weapons Complex embarked on a project for the indigenous development of UAVs (unmanned aerial vehicles) in mid-1998. The Sky Tracker and Sky Navigator software suites were developed for the ground-based tracking of UAVs. The software retrieves the GPS position data from the UAV via a radio data-link17 and uses it to show the position of the UAV as a 2D plot along with other essential data such as, speed, altitude, heading, etc. This plot can be overlaid onto area maps as well. This information is used by the pilot for flying the UAV from the ground-based command station.

References

A
Pakistan federal departments and agencies
Defence companies of Pakistan
Weapon development
Military research of Pakistan
1992 establishments in Pakistan
Guided missile manufacturers